HMS Salmon was a second-batch S-class submarine built during the 1930s for the Royal Navy. Completed in 1935, the boat fought in the Second World War. Salmon is one of twelve boats named in the song "Twelve Little S-Boats".

On 4 December 1939, Salmon became the first boat to sink a U-boat during the Second World War when it torpedoed and sank the German  in the North Sea south-west of Kristiansand, Norway.

Design and description
The second batch of S-class submarines were designed as slightly improved and enlarged versions of the earlier boats of the class and were intended to operate in the North and Baltic Seas. They displaced  on the surface and  submerged. The S-class submarines had a crew of 40 officers and ratings.

For surface running, the boats were powered by two  diesel engines, each driving one propeller shaft. When submerged each propeller was driven by a  electric motor. They could reach  on the surface and  underwater.

The S-class boats were armed with six 21-inch (533 mm) torpedo tubes in the bow. They carried six reload torpedoes for a total of a dozen torpedoes. They were also armed with a 3-inch (76 mm) deck gun.

Construction and career
Ordered on 20 January 1933, Salmon was laid down on 15 June 1933 in Cammell Laird's shipyard in Birkenhead and was launched on 30 April 1934. The boat was completed on 8 March 1935 and received the pennant number 98S.

On 4 December 1939, while on patrol in the North Sea, Salmon torpedoed and sank .

On 12 December 1939, Salmon sighted the German liner . While challenging Bremen, an escorting Dornier Do 18 seaplane forced Salmon to dive. After diving, Salmons commander, Lieutenant Commander E. O. Bickford, decided not to torpedo the liner because he believed she was not a legal target. Bickford's decision not to fire on Bremen likely delayed the start of unrestricted submarine warfare in the war.

On 13 December 1939, Salmon sighted a fleet of German warships. Salmon evaded the fleet's destroyers, which hunted her for two hours.

She was lost, probably sunk by a mine, on 9 July 1940.

There is a report from 2008 that the same survey ship that found the wreck of the sister submarine  also found the wreck of HMS Salmon nearby in waters off Norway.

Citations

References

External links
 HMS Salmon at Uboat.net

 

British S-class submarines (1931)
1934 ships
World War II submarines of the United Kingdom
Lost submarines of the United Kingdom
Ships built on the River Mersey
Maritime incidents in July 1940
Ships sunk by mines